Thomas Robinson (? - ?) was an Irish born soldier in the Union Army who was awarded the Medal of Honor during the American Civil War. He was awarded the medal for "Capture of flag in a hand-to-hand conflict" on May 12, 1864 at the Battle of Spotsylvania Courthouse whilst serving as a Private in the 81st Pennsylvania Infantry. He was awarded the medal on December 1, 1864.

References 

1833 births
Date of death unknown
Irish-born Medal of Honor recipients
19th-century Irish people
Union Army soldiers
Irish soldiers in the United States Army
American Civil War recipients of the Medal of Honor
United States Army Medal of Honor recipients
Military personnel from County Mayo